Zhuyeping Township is an rural township in Sangzhi County, Zhangjiajie, Hunan Province, China.

Administrative division
The township is divided into 16 villages, the following areas: Zhengjiayu Village, Kangsanyu Village, Muyu Village, Liulangping Village, Chenzijie Village, Jigongya Village, Maohuajie Village, Chaya Village, Liushuta Village, Gandong Village, Qinyu Village, Sanbaidun Village, Majiaxi Village, Liuyangxi Village, Zhuyeping Village, and Nanhu Village.

References

Divisions of Sangzhi County